The Mitsubishi Eclipse is a sport compact car that was produced by Mitsubishi in four generations from 1989 until 2011. A convertible body style was added during the 1996 model year.

The first two generations share the automobile platform and parts with the rebadged Eagle Talon and Plymouth Laser captive imports. They were built during Mitsubishi Motors' close relationship with Chrysler Corporation. Their partnership was known as Diamond-Star Motors (DSM). In Japan, the first two generations were sold at a specific Japanese retail chain called Mitsubishi Car Plaza. The third, 2000-2005 generation shared a redesigned platform with the Chrysler Sebring and Dodge Stratus. In May 2005, the fourth, and final generation Eclipse was introduced, replacing the Chrysler platform used for the third generation with the PS platform.

According to Mitsubishi Motors, the Eclipse was named after an unbeaten 18th-century English racehorse that won 18 races in a row and then retired.

The Eclipse was officially sold in Japan, North America, the Middle East, South Korea, the Philippines, Brazil, and China. At the end of August 2011, the final Eclipse was manufactured and subsequently auctioned for charity.

In 2017, Mitsubishi resurrected the Eclipse name on a compact crossover vehicle, titled the Eclipse Cross.

First generation (D21A/D22A/D27A; 1989)

Overview

The first-generation Mitsubishi Eclipse was marketed as an entry to mid-level four-cylinder sports coupe segment. Five trim levels were available; all were front-wheel drive except the GSX which was all-wheel drive. The GS Turbo and GSX were equipped with turbocharged engines.

The first-generation Eclipse underwent minor styling changes during its production; 1992–1994 models have updated sheet metal and are easily distinguishable from earlier model years. The most notable is that the 1990-1991 models have pop-up headlights, whereas 1992-1994 models have exposed aerodynamic headlights. The Eclipse was revised for the 1995 model year as the second generation.

Trim levels

The Eclipse was available in five trim levels during its first-generation production run. AWD models were not available until halfway through the first model year.

Eclipse: Base model equipped with a  naturally-aspirated 1.8 L 8-valve SOHC 4G37 4-cylinder engine
Eclipse GS: Upgraded model with slightly more equipment
Eclipse GS DOHC: Upgraded model equipped with a  naturally aspirated 2.0 L 16-valve DOHC Mitsubishi Sirius engine; a naturally aspirated variant of the 4G63T 4-cylinder engine
Eclipse GS DOHC AWD: Equipped with a  4G63 16-valve naturally-aspirated engine (AWD N/A only available in Europe) All were only available with 5-speed manual transmission and without rear limited-slip differential. Sunroof, cruise control, anti-lock brakes, central locking, and air conditioning were included.
Eclipse GS Turbo: Upgraded model equipped with a * turbocharged 2.0 L 16-valve DOHC 4G63T 4-cylinder engine
Eclipse GSX: AWD model equipped with a * turbocharged 2.0 L 16-valve DOHC 4G63T 4-cylinder engine

This was for the purpose of offsetting the additional weight of the AWD mechanism (approximately 2,930 lbs Vs 2,570 lbs GVW). However, 1991 and later years of both turbo models standardized on the 195 hp version 4G63T. The automatic models were rated at  due to smaller fuel-injectors and turbocharger.

These models varied significantly in drivetrains and available options, and included some variance in appearance, as higher trim lines added different front and rear fascia panels and surrounding trim, with the GSX model getting a notably different styling package from the others.

Powertrain
The basic driveline layout of the Eclipse is a transverse-mounted 4-cylinder Mitsubishi 4G37 or 4G63 engine situated on the left-hand side of the car driving an automatic or manual transmission on the right-hand side. AWD models have a different transmission which includes a limited-slip center differential and output shaft for a transfer case, which drives the rear differential (also available as limited-slip) and half-shafts.

Engines
The 4G37 and 4G63 engines are gasoline inline-fours. The 4G63 has an iron engine block with an aluminum cylinder head and is equipped with two balance shafts. The turbocharged version of the 4G63 (sometimes referred to as the 4G63T) has a lower compression ratio of 7.8:1 and oil squirters under the pistons for better cooling from extra heat created by forced induction. The turbocharged 4G63 engine received an internal update during the 1992 model year. The engines built from 1989 through April 1992 have 6-bolt motors. Beginning in May 1992, Mitsubishi revised the engine to a 7-bolt design.

Problems and issues
In March 1998, Mitsubishi issued a recall (bulletin 98V069001) for all 1990-1998 Mitsubishi Eclipse GSXs citing, "Lockup of the transfer case can occur due to insufficient lubrication. The condition can cause a loss of vehicle control increasing the risk of a crash." The dealers would inspect the vehicles for the adequacy of the transfer case oil volume, transfer case oil leakage, and operational degradation of the transfer case mechanism. The transfer case itself did not leak but rather the brass plug in the center of the transfer case yoke would leak. Mitsubishi estimated 24,275 vehicles were affected.

Safety
The National Highway Traffic Safety Administration (NHTSA) has determined crash test ratings of the 1G Eclipse:

Awards
The Eclipse Turbo was on Car and Driver magazine's Ten Best list for 1989–1992.

Second generation (D31A/D32A/D38A/D39A; 1994)

Overview

The Eclipse was redesigned in 1994 (for the 1995 model year) and included standard dual airbags, more rounded styling, a larger interior, and a new engine made by Chrysler for the base model. The second-generation car maintained the market focus of the first-generation car but had numerous changes to appeal to a broader market. A convertible model, named the Eclipse Spyder, was introduced in 1996 offered in two trim levels; the GS and the GS-T. The Spyder GS was powered by a 2.4 L 4-cylinder naturally aspirated 4G64 engine. The Spyder GS-T was fitted with Mitsubishi's 2.0 L turbocharged 4G63 4-cylinder engine. The GSX model was also powered by this engine but with the addition of a high performance all-wheel-drive system. No convertible model was powered by the Chrysler's 420a engine, nor was there a convertible with all-wheel-drive.

The turbocharged engine option was updated for more power as compared to the previous generation ( vs. ). The naturally aspirated cars had two different 4-cylinder engines depending on the market. The US version engines produced 140 hp, found only in the RS and GS trims, and were a modified version of the Chrysler Neon engine, the 420A, manufactured by Chrysler and delivered to and installed at the Diamond Star Motors facility. International market Eclipses made less horsepower than their Japanese domestic market relatives when equipped with the 4G63, due to emissions regulations.

This model exceeded Japanese government's compact car regulations regarding exterior dimensions (maximum width of ), therefore incurred a more expensive annual road tax obligation.

A special version of the Eclipse, called the "10th Anniversary OZ Rally", was sold at the end of the 1999 model run with unique 16-inch Enkei wheels with the OZ Racing logo. It also included the leather interior package, accented exhaust exit, “silver” gauges, mud flaps, and higher-profile spoiler that were available as standard equipment on GS-T coupe and GSX models. The special-edition package was only offered with the 420A engine.

A unique version of the 2G Eclipse was sold in some European countries. It used a naturally aspirated Mitsubishi 4G63 motor, similar to what was available in the 1G, unique side-view mirrors, and amber rear turn signals.

A minor style revision was applied for the 1997 model year. The front grille opening was given a more aggressive profile. The headlights were given a sharper slant on the inner edges, and the previous all-chrome fixture interior changed to a black interior with chrome reflector inserts. The driving lights were revised from a reflector type to a smaller projection type. The rear bumper cap was altered and had the reverse lights restyled and moved out into the bumper fascia, away from their original central position by the rear license plate bracket. The GS-T coupe and GSX received a higher-profile rear spoiler. The interior color choices also changed from blue and grey in 1995–1996 model years to black/grey, tan/black, and grey in the 1997–1999 model years. A black leather interior option was only available in 1999; the package included all seats (with the 'Mitsubishi' logo embroidered on both of the fronts), door inserts, and a center console armrest.

Trim levels
The Eclipse was available in seven trim levels: Base [Only available in 1996.5 (mid-model year)], RS (Rally Sport), GS (Grand Sport), GS Spyder, GS-T (Grand Sport Turbo), GS-T Spyder, and GSX (Grand Sport X=AWD).

The European variant of the GS had a naturally-aspirated, DOHC 16-valve 4G63 4-cylinder engine producing 150 HP
Eclipse Spyder GS: Convertible model equipped with a  2.4 L 16-valve SOHC Mitsubishi 4G64 4-cylinder engine

Standard equipment
The second-generation Eclipse was offered in various trim levels.  Standard equipment would vary slightly throughout the production run as some items that were optional on certain trims became standard later in the production run.  Each trim level came with a standard list of equipment however optional equipment packages were also available to add popular and premium features, most commonly found on the GS model.  In addition, optional equipment was also available such as a trunk-mounted CD player, leather interior on the GS and GS-T  and HomeLink and other items such as floormats and wheel locks.

RS: 2.0 L DOHC 4-cylinder engine, 5-speed manual or 4-speed automatic transmission, driver and passenger airbags, power steering, cloth reclining front bucket seats, 5-way adjustable driver's seat with memory recliner, center storage console, folding rear seat, map lights, remote fuel door and rear hatch releases, tachometer, trip odometer, low fluid warning lights, AM/FM radio, digital clock, tinted glass, rear defogger, dual remote mirrors, color-keyed bumpers and front air dam, 14-inch wheels with full wheel covers (195/70/HR14 tires.)
GS adds: 4-wheel disc brakes, 6-way (7-way in 1995) adjustable driver's seat, split-folding rear seat, tilt steering column, cassette player, Power antenna (96-99), cruise control, body-colored power mirrors, door handles and rear spoiler, fog lights, a cargo cover and net, 16-inch wheels with 205/55/HR16 tires (96-99 models), lower bodyside cladding, rear windshield washer/wiper.
GS-T adds: turbocharged and intercooled engine, engine oil cooler, air conditioning, cruise control, turbo boost, and oil pressure gauges, Infinity 8-speaker AM/FM cassette/CD player with separate amplifier, anti-theft system, power windows/door locks, sport-tuned shock absorbers, 16-inch alloy 5-spoke wheels, bright dual exhaust outlets.
Spyder GS-T adds:  variable-assist power steering, sport suspension, power insulated soft top with glass rear window, vinyl tonneau cover, leather upholstery, remote keyless entry, theft-deterrent system, leather-wrapped steering wheel and shift knob, 205/55VR16 tires.
GSX adds to GS-T: Permanent all-wheel drive, 17-inch alloy wheels with 215/50/VR17 tires (97-99), 16-inch alloy wheels with 215/55/VR16 tires with a manual transmission 205/55/VR16 tires for automatic transmission (95-96), limited-slip rear differential (optional 97–98), power driver's seat (96-99), anti-lock brakes (optional 95–99), leather-wrapped steering wheel and manual transmission knob, leather package, 10.8-inch vented front rotors with dual-piston calipers and vented rear rotors (rear vented only early 95).

Powertrain
The basic driveline layout of the Eclipse is a transverse-mounted 4-cylinder Chrysler 420A, Mitsubishi 4G64, or 4G63 engine. The Mitsubishi motors are mounted in the same orientation as the first generation cars. The 420A-powered cars had the engine mounted on the right side of the car, and further back in the chassis. AWD models had a similar transmission to the first generation car. The second-generation GSX also had a stronger carrier/differential when equipped with the limited-slip option.

Engines
All motors are four-cylinder gasoline engines. All have cast iron blocks with aluminum cylinder heads. The 4G63/4G64 engines retain the balance shafts for smoother operation, while the 420a does not. This was done to minimize turbo lag, which was an undesirable trait for mass-market appeal in the U.S. These changes led to increased horsepower and torque vs. the previous 1G turbos.

The 4G63T engines found in 1990–1994 models have a  throttle body compared to the 1995–1999 MY's . The intake ports on the head and runners of the intake manifold are also larger on the 1G. They also have larger crankshaft bearing journals to allow better lubrication. Because they look similar, it is important to note that the 1990-1994 cylinder head is more on the side of high air volume, while the 1995-1999 cylinder head is more on the side of high air velocity.

Mitsubishi Motors quietly updated its 4G63 engine in 1998 and 1999. The crankshaft is more precisely shaved and cut compared to previous years. It is identical to that used in the Mitsubishi Lancer Evolution, which was not yet sold in North America until 2003. The thrust bearings have been revised to a "split" type to allow better lubrication and self-alignment with the crankshaft. It also had improved tuning and functionality thanks to a new ECU, which was similar to Lancer Evolution ECUs. Although originally deactivated to protect the drivetrain, it included advanced features such as launch control, boost control, adjustable rev-limit, fuel system control as well as fuel and boost map selection for certain Mitsubishi Heavy Industries turbochargers.

Problems and issues
The second-generation Eclipse received numerous Technical Service Bulletins (TSB) affecting a variety of issues with the car however there was one notable powertrain recall. In March 1998, Mitsubishi issued a recall (bulletin 98V069001) for all 1990-1998 Mitsubishi Eclipse GSXs citing, "Lockup of the transfer case can occur due to insufficient lubrication. The condition can cause a loss of vehicle control increasing the risk of a crash." The dealers would inspect the vehicles for the adequacy of the transfer case oil volume, transfer case oil leakage, and operational degradation of the transfer case mechanism. The transfer case itself did not leak but rather the brass plug in the center of the transfer case yoke would leak. Mitsubishi estimated 24,275 vehicles were affected.

Another issue that impacted the mid 1995-1997 Eclipse GS-T/GSX (4G63 equipped vehicles) is thrust bearing failure commonly referred to in the Eclipse community as "crankwalk." Mitsubishi never publicly addressed the issue via a recall or TSB. There were a variety of symptoms however the most common symptom of crankwalk is the clutch pedal would stick to the floor upon making a left turn. If crankwalk occurred, it typically meant engine failure. In 1998, Mitsubishi revised manufacturing processes to correct the issue.

Safety
All 2G Eclipses came standard with driver and front-passenger airbags, side-guard door beams, front and rear body structure crumple zones, 5 mph energy-absorbing bumpers, safety-cage body construction, 4-wheel disc brakes (except RS), three-point ELR/ALR lap/shoulder safety belts (ELR only for the driver) and height-adjustable front shoulder belts. Anti-lock brakes were optional on all models (except for RS).

The National Highway Traffic Safety Administration (NHTSA) has determined crash test ratings of the 2G Eclipse:

Awards
1995 and 1996 "Driver's Choice Award" - MotorWeek

Third generation (D52A/D53A; 1999)

Overview
The Eclipse underwent a change into its third generation in 1999, closely applying the Mitsubishi SST design study which debuted at the 1998 North American International Auto Show. It was the first concept vehicle exhibited by Mitsubishi at an auto show in the U.S.

Two new powertrain options were available, a  2.4 L 16-valve SOHC 4-cylinder 4G64 and a  24v SOHC 3.0 L V6 (6G72). AWD was no longer an option. The suspension setup was modified to provide a softer and more compliant ride quality.

The third-generation Eclipse shared its powertrain with the 8th generation Galant.

In mid-2002, the GTS trim was introduced for the 2003 model year. This vehicle included an engine with a 10:1 compression ratio, revised camshaft profile, and an improved Mitsubishi Variable Induction Management (MVIM) air intake system that gave the car an extra  and a slightly improved power curve. The 2003–2005 GTS coupe, GTS Spyder and GT Spyder shared the new engine while the GT coupe retained the  powertrain.

With the introduction of the 2003 GTS model, the Eclipse saw minor changes including a redesigned front bumper with slotted fog lights, as well as a recoloring of the taillights. On the interior, the gauge face changed, and the door panels were also redesigned. Newly designed five-spoke chrome wheels were offered with the GT and GTS trims.

In 2004, Mitsubishi Motors imported the Eclipse Spyder to the Japanese Domestic Market as a special edition.

Trim levels
The Eclipse was available in 7 trim levels: RS, GS, GS Spyder, GT, GT Spyder, GTS, and GTS Spyder. All trim levels (besides RS and the Spyder) came with an automatic tilt and retracting sunroof. All models were front-wheel drive (FWD). The GTS trims were introduced for the 2003 model year. For the 2005 model year, the RS trim was discontinued and a special "Remix Edition" GS trim package was introduced, which included chrome wheels, identifying placards, and the premium interior package from the GT and GTS models, which was not previously offered on the GS trim.

Eclipse RS: Base model equipped with a  2.4 L 16-valve SOHC Mitsubishi 4G64 engine; automatic RS models were only 3G Eclipse without Mitsubishi's "sportronic" select-shift option
Eclipse GS: Upgraded model equipped with a  2.4 L 16-valve SOHC Mitsubishi 4G64 engine
Eclipse GS Spyder: Convertible model equipped with a  2.4 L 16-valve SOHC Mitsubishi 4G64 engine
Eclipse GT: Upgraded model equipped with a  3.0 L 24-valve SOHC Mitsubishi 6G72 engine
Eclipse GT Spyder: 2000-2002: convertible model equipped with a  3.0 L 24-valve SOHC Mitsubishi 6G72 engine. 2003-2005: convertible FWD model equipped with a  3.0 L 24-valve SOHC Mitsubishi 6G72 engine with MVIM
Eclipse GTS: Upgraded model equipped with a  3.0 L 24-valve SOHC Mitsubishi 6G72 engine with Mitsubishi Variable Induction Management (MVIM)
Eclipse GTS Spyder: Convertible model equipped with a  3.0 L 24-valve SOHC Mitsubishi 6G72 engine with MVIM

Engines
The third-generation Eclipse utilized two distinct Mitsubishi engines: The SOHC 4G64 2.4 L 16-valve four-cylinder and SOHC 6G72 3.0 L 24-valve V6. Both engines use cast iron blocks with aluminum cylinder heads.

In 2003, the 3.0 L V6 was improved for the GTS and GT/GTS Spyder, using a revised camshaft profile, raised compression ratio of 10:1 and variable-length MVIM intake manifold. This engine produced .

Safety
The National Highway Traffic Safety Administration (NHTSA) has determined crash test ratings of Eclipse of different model years:

2001 Mitsubishi Eclipse EV
The Mitsubishi Eclipse EV is a prototype electric vehicle with a lightweight electric motor and lithium-ion batteries in the chassis of a third-generation Eclipse. It is powered by manganese lithium-ion batteries made by Japan Storage Battery, which have 65% reduced charging time over nickel-hydrogen batteries.

Fourth generation (DK2A/DK4A; 2005)

Overview
Another substantial styling revision was introduced, with the fourth-generation model taking some of the profile from the second generation model but maintaining a front fascia consistent with Mitsubishi's corporate styling features of the time. Drivetrain features include a  3.8 L MIVEC V6 engine for the GT trim, 2009 and newer models have . The GS has a  2.4 L MIVEC four-cylinder engine, both derived from the Mitsubishi PS platform family, with which the Eclipse shares many mechanical components. Like the 2004 Galant and third-generation Eclipse, the fourth-generation Eclipse is FWD only, although a concept model has been produced by Mitsubishi and Ralliart with a MillenWorks designed hybrid-electric AWD platform, the 4G63 engine from the Lancer Evolution, and more aggressive body styling with imitation carbon fiber accents.

The fourth-generation Spyder (convertible) Eclipse was released for the 2007 model year at the North American International Auto Show.

Trim levels
For the 2010 model year in the U.S., its primary market, the Eclipse was available in five trim levels: GS, GS Sport Spyder, SE, GT, and GT Spyder. In Mexico, the GT Spyder is known as the Eclipse Convertible. In Canada, the GT trim is known as the GT-P.

The models and standard / optional equipment:

GS Standard- Choice of five-speed manual or a four-speed Sportronic automatic transmission, a 140-watt (max.) Mitsubishi CD/MP3-compatible audio system with six speakers, 17-inch alloy wheels, an anti-theft immobilizer, auto-off halogen headlamps, power windows/locks/mirrors, air conditioning, a split fold-down rear seat, two 12-volt accessory outlets, anti-lock brakes, a rear spoiler, and a six airbag safety system.

Options Include - Sun & Sound package with a power sunroof is paired with a 650-watt Rockford Fosgate audio system. Boasting nine speakers including a  trunk-mounted subwoofer, a 6-CD in-dash changer, and steering-wheel-mounted audio controls, the package also includes a central display with outside temperature and compass readings and an electrochromic rear-view mirror.

GS Spyder - available for sale for the 2007 model year.
Options Include - GS Deluxe Leather Package: Leather front seating surfaces, heated front seats, heated side mirrors, outside temperature indicator and compass in the center dash display.

GT Standard - Choice of six-speed manual or a five-speed Sportronic automatic transmission, a 140-watt (max.) Mitsubishi CD/MP3-compatible audio system with six speakers, 17-inch alloy wheels, an anti-theft immobilizer, auto-off halogen headlamps, fog lamps, power windows/locks/mirrors, air conditioning, a split fold-down rear seat, two 12-volt accessory outlets, 4-wheel anti-lock disc brakes, a rear spoiler, dual-stage six airbag safety system, traction control, a front strut tower bar, and a center display with outside temperature and compass readings.
Options Include- Premium Sport Package with  seven-spoke alloy wheels, leather front seating surfaces, a power sunroof, an eight-way-adjustable (six power) driver's seat, alloy pedals, heated front seats, heated door mirrors, automatic dimming rear-view mirror, air conditioning, and a 650-watt Rockford Fosgate audio system with nine speakers that included a 10-in (254 mm) trunk-mounted subwoofer, a 6-CD/MP3-compatible in-dash changer, and steering wheel-mounted audio controls.

GT Spyder - available for sale for the 2007 model year.
Options Include - GT Premium Sport Package: 18-inch alloy wheels  leather front seating surfaces, 6-way power driver's seat, heated front seats, heated side mirrors, aluminum pedals, automatic climate control and a wind deflector.

Engines
The displacement is 2378 cc, with a bore of 87 mm and a stroke of 100 mm. The engine runs 9.5:1 compression. Firing order is 1-3-2-4. It uses 315 cc top feed high impedance injectors with a returnless fuel rail. It has a 62 mm throttle body. The stock exhaust diameter is 2 1/8".
GT - Equipped with the V6  with bore  X stroke  SOHC 4 valves per cylinder 60° V-block 6G75 engine capable of making  in factory trim and a compression ratio of 10.5:1. The firing order is 1-2-3-4-5-6. It uses 315 cc top feed high impedance injectors with a returnless fuel rail. It has a 65 mm throttle body. The stock exhaust diameter is 2 1/4". The intake valves begin to open at 5° before top dead center, and close 55° after top dead center. The exhaust valves open 51° after top dead center, and close 17° after top dead center. The oil pump is a trochoid type. The cooling system is water cooled forced circulation with a centrifugal impeller type pump.

Facelifts

The Mitsubishi Eclipse was given a minor facelift for the 2009 model year, the front fascia changed the fog lights and deleted the triangle housing the "three diamond" logo used to sit on in the grille; the rear fascia changed the "Eclipse" insignia from an indent to raised silver letters. An option to add a dual exhaust and projector H.I.D. headlamps also became available. It was unveiled at the 2008 Chicago Auto Show.

For 2011, the Mitsubishi Eclipse featured a "blackout" roof, similar to the 1990 model. Mitsubishi also lowered the suspension of Eclipse about half an inch to create a lower center of gravity. A rear backup camera and Bluetooth hands free calling to the Sun and sound package were included. In the GS trim, the car gets the same 18-inch wheels and blackout front end as the GT model called the GS Sport.

Final model year

For the 2012 model year, the Eclipse received three slight changes: brake override logic, a clear lip spoiler on the GT trim, and one new exterior color. According to a review and rating by Motor Trend, the fourth-generation Eclipse was described as "dated" - but its "exterior design still stands out among sporty coupes currently available." The 2012 model year Eclipse was now six years old and "is still trying to pass itself off as a sporty two-door." This was the final model year, albeit a short run because production ended in August 2011.

The last Eclipse to roll off the assembly line was built on 16 August 2011, painted Kalapana Black, its color was chosen by members of Mitsubishi's Facebook community, who picked from a historical Eclipse color palette. This was the only Eclipse equipped with both the 3.8L/265 hp V-6 engine and the commemorative SE package, as well as special 18-inch Dark Argent alloy wheels and one of a kind graphics. It is also built with a sunroof, leather interior, 650W Rockford Fosgate 9-speaker audio system with Sirius XM, hands-free Bluetooth phone interface, rear-view camera, and HID headlights. The car was auctioned off by Mecum Auctions in St. Charles, Illinois on 17 September 2012, for $35,000. Proceeds went to the Japanese Red Cross to aid victims of the 2011 Tōhoku earthquake and tsunami.

Grand total Eclipse production was 906,876 units.

Recalls
05V247000 - Recalled 6 February 2005, vehicles were found equipped with faulty brake booster assemblies. The brake booster could separate due to improper crimp joints resulting in total brake failure
05V299000 - Recalled 27 June 2005, master cylinders were found to have improperly installed seals. Brake fluid may bypass the seal and result in longer pedal stroke, and reduced braking pressure
15V337000 - Recalled 6 February 2015, vehicles made between 23 December 2005 and 13 February 2009 were recalled for corrosion issues in the ABS unit. This can cause internal valves to seize, resulting in sudden brake failure or reduced stopping ability
08V454000 - Recalled 9 September 2008, certain 2005-2007 vehicles had improper fuel tank mounting brackets which could split. This could result in the fuel tank to come undone in a collision and potentially cause a fuel leak.

Motorsport
The Eclipse has been campaigned in various auto racing events.

Rally, endurance and road racing
The Eclipse, and its Chrysler-branded counterparts, have competed in Sports Car Club of America (SCCA) events.

In 1995, a GT2 class specification Eclipse GSX was entered into the annual 24 Hours of Daytona endurance race. It was placed on grid number 74, at the back in last place. It moved up to 24th place overall finish without any issues. It nearly set a new record as well, passing a total of 50 cars. In 1998, it entered the race again but was now in a lower specification class (GT3/GTS3) It finished in 24th place. In 1999, the Eclipse made its final appearance in the race, achieving 39th place, after posting 455 laps. The name of the team was Spirit of Daytona and their sponsor was Daytona Mitsubishi. Craig Conway, Eric Van Cleef, and Todd Flis were the drivers.

In 2004 and 2005, Greg Collier won the NASA Super Unlimited class national title in a Plymouth Laser RS Turbo. These wins were over purpose built Ferrari Challenge and Porsche Carrera Cup race cars.

In 2009 and 2010, an Eclipse Spyder GS-T driven by Matt Andrews and Andrew Brilliant won the Super Lap Battle Limited championship in Willow Springs, California.

In 2012, a heavily built and tuned Mitsubishi Eclipse piloted by Mark Rybníček won the Czech Hill Climb championship. Other drivers such as Karel Stehlik and David Komarek have used Eclipses in hill climb competition as well. They also have short transmission gears to accelerate into triple-digit speeds.

Drag racing
Brent Rau has won three world drag racing championships using an Eclipse; IDRC, NDRA, and NHRA. Many other notable names have also claimed big wins piloting Eclipses for drag racing as well.

Jett Racing entered a third-generation Eclipse for drag racing competition. As of 2014, they hold the world record for the world's fastest four cylinder. It has  and is RWD. On 29 November 2018, they ran 6.2 seconds in the quarter-mile with 225 MPH for the top speed.

See also
DSM
Plymouth Laser
Eagle Talon

Notes

References

External links

Eclipse
Cars introduced in 1989
Cars discontinued in 2012
1990s cars
2000s cars
2010s cars
Sport compact cars
Hatchbacks
Convertibles
All-wheel-drive vehicles
Front-wheel-drive sports cars
Cars discontinued in 2011